George William Chafer VC (16 April 1894 – 1 March 1966) was an English recipient of the Victoria Cross, the highest and most prestigious award for gallantry in the face of the enemy that can be awarded to British and Commonwealth forces.

He was 22 years old, and a private in the 1st Battalion, The East Yorkshire Regiment, British Army during the First World War when the following deed took place for which he was awarded the VC.

On 3/4 June 1916 east of Méaulte, Somme, France, during a very heavy bombardment and attack on our trenches, a man carrying an important written message to his commanding officer was half buried and rendered unconscious by a shell. Private Chafer, at once grasping the situation, on his own initiative, took the message from the man's pocket and, although severely wounded, choking and blinded by gas, ran along the ruined parapet under heavy shell and machine-gun fire. He just succeeded in delivering the message before he collapsed from the effects of his wounds.

His Victoria Cross is displayed at The Prince of Wales's Own Regiment of Yorkshire Museum, 3 Tower Street, York, England.

References

External links
 Location of grave and VC medal (South Yorkshire)
 

1894 births
1966 deaths
Military personnel from Bradford
East Yorkshire Regiment soldiers
British Army personnel of World War I
British World War I recipients of the Victoria Cross
British Army recipients of the Victoria Cross